The Beaver First Nation is a First Nation government or band, made up of members of the Danezaa people, also known as the Beavers.  The Beaver First Nation is one of only two Danezaa bands in Alberta (the other being the Horse Lake First Nation), but there are several others nearby in British Columbia.  The band controls two reserves, Boyer 164 and Child Lake 164A both near Fort Vermilion, Alberta in the Peace Country of Northern Alberta.  The band is a member of the North Peace Tribal Council and is party to Treaty 8. In April 2016, the band had a registered population of 1,065, more than half of which lived off reserve.

References

External links 
 First Nation Detail, Aboriginal Affairs and Northern Development Canada

First Nations governments in Alberta
Dane-zaa
Mackenzie County